SIIMA Award for Best Actor – Telugu is presented by Vibri media group as part of its annual South Indian International Movie Awards, for the best acting done by an actor in Telugu films. The award was first given in 2012 for films released in 2011. Mahesh Babu is the most nominated with 8 nominations and most awarded with four times winning the award.

Superlatives

Winners

Nominations 
2011: Mahesh Babu – Dookudu
Prabhas – Mr. Perfect
Naga Chaitanya – 100% Love 
Nagarjuna – Rajanna
Balakrishna – Sri Rama Rajyam
2012:  Pawan Kalyan – Gabbar Singh
Rana Daggubati – Krishnam Vande Jagadgurum 
Mahesh Babu – Businessman
Nagarjuna – Shirdi Sai
Allu Arjun – Julayi
Ram Charan – Racha
2013: Mahesh Babu – Seethamma Vakitlo Sirimalle Chettu
Ram Charan Teja – Naayak
Venkatesh – Seethamma Vakitlo Sirimalle Chettu 
Pawan Kalyan – Attarintiki Daredi
Rana Daggubati – Krishnam Vande Jagadgurum
Prabhas – Mirchi
2014: Balakrishna – Legend
Mahesh Babu – 1: Nenokkadine
Venkatesh – Drushyam 
Naga Chaitanya – Manam
Allu Arjun – Race Gurram
2015: Mahesh Babu – Srimanthudu
Ram Charan Teja – Bruce Lee: The Fighter
Nani  – Bhale Bhale Magadivoy 
Prabhas – Baahubali: The Beginning
Varun Tej – Kanche
2016: NTR Jr. – Janatha Garage 
Nithiin – A Aa
Venkatesh – Babu Bangaram
Nani – Krishna Gadi Veera Prema Gaadha 
Ram Charan Teja – Dhruva
2017: Prabhas – Baahubali 2: The Conclusion
Balakrishna – Gautamiputra Satakarni
Vijay Deverakonda – Arjun Reddy
NTR Jr. – Jai Lava Kusa
Rana Daggubati – Nene Raju Nene Mantri 
2018: Ram Charan – Rangasthalam
Mahesh Babu – Bharat Ane Nenu
NTR Jr. – Aravinda Sametha Veera Raghava
Dulquer Salmaan  – Mahanati
Vijay Devarakonda – Geetha Govindam
Sudheer Babu - Sammohanam
2019: Mahesh Babu – Maharshi
 Ram Charan Teja – Vinaya Vidheya Rama
 Ram Pothineni – iSmart Shankar
 Varun Tej – Gaddalakonda Ganesh
 Nani – Jersey
 Naveen Polishetty – Agent Sai Srinivasa Athreya
2020: Allu Arjun – Ala Vaikunthapurramuloo
Mahesh Babu – Sarileru Neekevvaru
Sudheer Babu – V
Satyadev – Uma Maheswara Ugra Roopasya
Nithiin – Bheeshma
2021: Allu Arjun – Pushpa: The Rise
 Balakrishna – Akhanda
 Naveen Polishetty – Jathi Ratnalu
 Allari Naresh – Naandhi
 Naga Chaitanya – Love Story
 Nani – Shyam Singha Roy

See also 

 Tollywood

References

Best Actor Telugu